Aritao, officially the Municipality of Aritao, is a 2nd class municipality in the province of Nueva Vizcaya, Philippines. According to the 2020 census, it has a population of 42,197 people.

The ethnic minority called Isinai (the same term for the local spoken dialect) were the original residents of this town.

Etymology
The name Aritao came from the Isinai phrase Ari Tau "which stands for "Our King" (ari means king and tau means our) which refers to the legendary Isinai Chieftain Mengal, a fierce and brave king who resisted Spanish conquest of the Isinai territories around Ajanas and Ynordenan (the areas comprising what is now most of Aritao).

History
The town of Aritao was previously called “Ajanas”. This name was later changed to Aritao, after an Isinay word “Ari-Tau”. In January 1767, the intrepid Fr. Manuel Corripio, a Spanish Missionary succeeded in persuading an Igorot King called Ari Mengal and his tribe to live in the lowland, which is the seat of the Municipality of Aritao. These people were later converted into Christianity by Fr. Tomas Gutierrez. In the year 1777, there was a merging of Aritao with the adjacent places into one pueblo under the name of Aritao, which was approved by the Manila Authorities. On 30 June 1917, through the initiative of Councilor Jose Aleman, the application for township of Aritao to higher authorities was finally approved by the Secretary of the Interior.

In 1942, Japanese troops entered Aritao, Nueva Vizcaya. A monument to the gallantry of the Japanese and Filipino soldiers during World War II, located at Barangay Kirang, municipality of Aritao, Nueva Vizcaya. Built in 1978 by the Rakunsankai Society of Japan, it was recently rebuilt using a black glazed stone, and a memorial was engraved in the tablet in Japanese and English. Also offers a scenic view of reforested mountains and hills.

Geography

Barangays
Aritao is politically subdivided into 22 barangays. These barangays are headed by elected officials: Barangay Captain, Barangay Council, whose members are called Barangay Councilors. All are elected every three years.

Climate

Demographics

Economy

Government
Aritao, belonging to the lone congressional district of the province of Nueva Vizcaya, is governed by a mayor designated as its local chief executive and by a municipal council as its legislative body in accordance with the Local Government Code. The mayor, vice mayor, and the councilors are elected directly by the people through an election which is being held every three years.

Elected officials

Education
The Schools Division of Nueva Vizcaya governs the town's public education system. The division office is a field office of the DepEd in Cagayan Valley region. The office governs the public and private elementary and public and private high schools throughout the municipality.
 Aritao National High School
 Immaculate Conception Academy
 Saint Teresita's Academy
 Nueva Vizcaya Institute
 Santa Clara High School

Aritao also has a lot of schools for primary (elementary education).

Gallery

References

External links

 [ Philippine Standard Geographic Code]
Philippine Census Information
Local Governance Performance Management System

Municipalities of Nueva Vizcaya